Pseudotyrannochthonius silvestrii is a species of Chilean pseudoscorpions of the family Chthoniidae. It was described in 1905 by Edvard Ellingsen, with a type locality of Santiago, Chile.

References

Chthoniidae
Fauna of Chile
Animals described in 1905